Tao Hsuan (1899–1972) was a Chinese educator and politician. She was one of the first group of three women appointed to the Legislative Yuan in 1928.

Biography
Tao was born in Zhejiang province in 1899, originally from Taoyan in Shaoxing County. She attended the No. 1 Women's Normal School in Shanxi province, after which she enrolled in Chinese Language and Literature course at Peking Women's Normal University in 1917. In 1919 she transferred to the National Normal School for Women. Following the start of the May Fourth Movement, she was elected president of the Peking Federation of Women's Studies. In 1922 she was appointed headmistress of Peking No. 1 Girls' Middle School.

In 1928 she was appointed to the first Legislative Yuan, one of three women alongside Soong Mei-ling and Tcheng Yu-hsiu. She was later appointed to the second and third legislatures, remaining in office until 1935. In 1930 she became headmistress of Nanjing Girls' High School. Six years later she was appointed head of the World School Shanghai in 1936.

After the war she was a delegate to the 1946  that drew up the constitution of the Republic of China. She remained in China following the Civil War and was elected to Jiangsu Province Chinese People's Political Consultative Conference in 1955.

Never married, she died in 1972.

References

1899 births
Chinese schoolteachers
20th-century Chinese women politicians
Members of the Kuomintang
Members of the Legislative Yuan
1972 deaths
20th-century Chinese politicians